How to Steal 2 Million is a 2011 South African action drama film, written & directed by Charlie Vundla, produced by Karen E. Johnson, Jeremy Nathan, Mfundi Vundla and Michelle Wheatley and starring John Kani, Hlubi Mboya, Menzi Ngubane, Terry Pheto and Rapulana Seiphemo. The film received 11 nominations and won four awards at the Africa Movie Academy Awards in 2012, including the awards for Best Picture, Best Director, Best Actress in a Supporting Role and Best Achievement in Editing.

Plot

A robber gets out of jail after five years, to find that his partner, who never got caught, has married his girlfriend. Desperate for money, he agrees to help his partner rob his partner's father for two million Rand. However the robbery goes wrong, and secret plans come out. As the pressure mounts on them, the tension builds towards the surprising and explosive finale.

Cast
John Kani
Hlubi Mboya
Menzi Ngubane
Terry Pheto
Rapulana Seiphemo

References

External links
 
 
 

2011 films
English-language South African films
Xhosa-language films
Zulu-language films
Best Film Africa Movie Academy Award winners
2011 action drama films
Best Editing Africa Movie Academy Award winners
Films scored by Trevor Jones
South African action drama films
2010s English-language films